In signal processing, the Nyquist rate, named after Harry Nyquist, is a value (in units of samples per second or hertz, Hz) equal to twice the highest frequency (bandwidth) of a given function or signal.  When the function is digitized at a higher sample rate (see ), the resulting discrete-time sequence is said to be free of the distortion known as aliasing.   Conversely, for a given sample-rate the corresponding Nyquist frequency in Hz is one-half the sample-rate.  Note that the Nyquist rate is a property of a continuous-time signal, whereas Nyquist frequency is a property of a discrete-time system. 

The term Nyquist rate is also used in a different context with units of symbols per second, which is actually the field in which Harry Nyquist was working.  In that context it is an upper bound for the symbol rate across a bandwidth-limited baseband channel such as a telegraph line or passband channel such as a limited radio frequency band or a frequency division multiplex channel.

Relative to sampling

When a continuous function,  is sampled at a constant rate,  samples/second, there is always an unlimited number of other continuous functions that fit the same set of samples. In most cases, the differences are viewed as distortion.

Intentional aliasing

Figure 3 depicts a type of function called baseband or lowpass, because its positive-frequency range of significant energy is [0, B).  When instead, the frequency range is (A, A+B), for some A > B, it is called bandpass, and a common desire (for various reasons) is to convert it to baseband.  One way to do that is frequency-mixing (heterodyne) the bandpass function down to the frequency range (0, B).  One of the possible reasons is to reduce the Nyquist rate for more efficient storage.  And it turns out that one can directly achieve the same result by sampling the bandpass function at a sub-Nyquist sample-rate that is the smallest integer-sub-multiple of frequency A that meets the baseband Nyquist criterion:  fs > 2B.  For a more general discussion, see bandpass sampling.

Relative to signaling

Long before Harry Nyquist had his name associated with sampling, the term Nyquist rate was used differently, with a meaning closer to what Nyquist actually studied.  Quoting Harold S. Black's 1953 book Modulation Theory, in the section Nyquist Interval of the opening chapter Historical Background:

"If the essential frequency range is limited to B cycles per second, 2B was given by Nyquist as the maximum number of code elements per second that could be unambiguously resolved, assuming the peak interference is less than half a quantum step.  This rate is generally referred to as signaling at the Nyquist rate and 1/(2B) has been termed a Nyquist interval." (bold added for emphasis; italics from the original)

According to the OED, Black's statement regarding 2B may be the origin of the term Nyquist rate.

Nyquist's famous 1928 paper was a study on how many pulses (code elements) could be transmitted per second, and recovered, through a channel of limited bandwidth.
Signaling at the Nyquist rate meant putting as many code pulses through a telegraph channel as its bandwidth would allow.  Shannon used Nyquist's approach when he proved the sampling theorem in 1948, but Nyquist did not work on sampling per se.

Black's later chapter on "The Sampling Principle" does give Nyquist some of the credit for some relevant math:

"Nyquist (1928) pointed out that, if the function is substantially limited to the time interval T, 2BT values are sufficient to specify the function, basing his conclusions on a Fourier series representation of the function over the time interval T."

See also
Nyquist frequency
Nyquist ISI criterion
Nyquist–Shannon sampling theorem
Sampling (signal processing)

Notes

References 

Digital signal processing
Telecommunication theory
Rates

de:Nyquist-Frequenz